Barrosa may refer to:
 HMS Barrosa (D68)
 Battle of Barrosa
 Barrosa, a parish of Portugal
 The Barrosã, a Portuguese breed of cattle

See also
Barossa (disambiguation)